Mark Senior (born 13 December 1963) is a Jamaican sprinter. He competed in the men's 400 metres at the 1984 Summer Olympics.

References

1963 births
Living people
Athletes (track and field) at the 1984 Summer Olympics
Jamaican male sprinters
Olympic athletes of Jamaica
Athletes (track and field) at the 1987 Pan American Games
Pan American Games medalists in athletics (track and field)
Pan American Games bronze medalists for Jamaica
Place of birth missing (living people)
Medalists at the 1987 Pan American Games
Central American and Caribbean Games medalists in athletics
20th-century Jamaican people
21st-century Jamaican people